Lorentzian may refer to
 Cauchy distribution, also known as the Lorentz distribution, Lorentzian function, or Cauchy–Lorentz distribution
 Lorentz transformation
 Lorentzian manifold

See also
Lorentz (disambiguation)
Lorenz (disambiguation), spelled without the 't'